is a district located in Ehime Prefecture, Japan.
The district contains two towns: Masaki and Tobe.
As of 2004 the estimated population is 52,832 with a total area of 121.89 km2.

History

1887 — The villages of Habu and Yodo were reassigned to the Onsen District (now the city of Matsuyama).
1889
The village of Nakayama in Kita District was reassigned to the Shimoukena District.
The village of Kurita in Shimoukena District merged into the village of Hirota in Shimoukena District.
1896 — The villages of Haramachi, Tobe, Hirota, Nakayama, Izubuchi, Saredani, Kaminada, and Shimonada were reassigned from the Shimoukena District to the Iyo District. (1 town, 15 villages)
January 1, 1907 — The village of Izubuchi merged into the village of Nakayama. (1 town, 12 villages)
September 30, 1908 — Parts of the village of Shimonada merged into the village of Michiho in Kita District (now the town of Uchiko)
September 3, 1921 — The village of Kaminada gained town status. (2 towns, 13 villages)
October 31, 1922 — The village of Masaki gained town status. (3 towns, 12 villages)
April 1, 1925
Parts of the village of Kaminada merged into the village of Minamiyamasaki.
The village of Nakayama gained town status. (4 towns, 11 villages)
November 10, 1928 — The village of Tobe gained town status. (5 towns, 10 villages)
March 15, 1929 — Parts of the village of Hirota (former village of Kurita areas) merged into the town of Nakayama.
January 1, 1940 — The village of Gunchū merged into the town of Gunchū. (5 towns, 9 villages)
January 1, 1955 — The villages of Minamiyamasaki, Kitayamasaki, Minamiiyo, and the town of Gunchū merged to form the city of Iyo. (4 towns, 6 villages)
February 1, 1955 — The village of Saredani merged into the town of Nakayama. (4 towns, 5 villages)
March 31, 1955
The village of Haramachi merged into the town of Tobe. (4 towns, 4 villages)
The villages of Kitaiyo and Okada merged into the town of Masaki. (4 towns, 2 villages)
The town of Kaminada and the village of Shimonada merged to form the town of Futami. (4 towns, 1 village)
November 1, 1958 — Parts of the city of Iyo merged into the town of Tobe.
January 1, 2005 — The village of Hirota merged into the town of Tobe. (4 towns)
April 1, 2005 — The towns of Nakayama and Futami merged into the city of Iyo. (2 towns)

Iyo District